Dzhalinda is a rural locality (a selo) and the administrative center of Dzhalindinsky Selsoviet of Skovorodinsky District, Amur Oblast, Russia. The population was 1,123 as of 2018.  There are 20 streets.

Geography 
Dzhalinda is located on the Amur River, 70 km south of Skovorodino (the district's administrative centre) by road. Albazino is the nearest rural locality.

References 

Rural localities in Skovorodinsky District